Reza is a Persian name, originating from the Arabic word , Riḍā, which literally means "the fact of being pleased or contented; contentment, approval". In religious context, this name is interpreted as satisfaction or "perfect contentment with God's will or decree". The name is neutral and not one used only by a particular sect, and is used widely by Iranians, Arab Christians and Arab Druze. According to Annemarie Schimmel, "riḍā is closely related to shukr"; "shukr" is an Arabic term denoting thankfulness and gratitude.

Given name

Religion
 Ali al-Ridha, Eighth Twelver Shi'a Imam.
 Ala Hazrat Imam Ahmed Raza Khan

Academics
 Reza Afshari, Iranian historian
 Reza Davari Ardakani, Iranian philosopher
 Reza Ghadiri, Iranian-American chemist 
 Reza Iravani, Iranian academic
 Rida Khawaldeh, Jordanian academic
 Reza Malekzadeh, Iranian physician
 Reza Mansouri, Iranian physicist
 Reza Olfati-Saber, Iranian roboticist
 Rida Said, Syrian physician
 Rıza Tevfik Bölükbaşı, Turkish scientist
 Reza Aslan, Iranian-American scholar, author, and journalist
 Reza Moridi, Canadian politician
 Reza Negarestani, Iranian-American Philosopher
 Reza Zadeh, American-Canadian-Iranian Computer Scientist

Arts
 Reza Abbasi (1565–1635), a Persian painter
 Reza Abdoh, Iranian-born American director
 Reza Abedini, Iranian designer 
 Reza Allamehzadeh, Persian-born Dutch film-maker
 Reza Amirkhani, Persian novelist
 Reza Badiyi, American film director
 Reza Baraheni, Iranian novelist
 Reza Borchardt, American magician
 Reza Deghati, professionally known as Reza, an Iranian-born photojournalist
 Reza Fayazi, Iranian film director
 Reza Feiz Noroozi, Iranian actor
 Reza Kianian, Iranian actor
 Reza Naji, Iranian actor
 Reza Parsa, Swedish film director
 Reza Qolikhan Hedayat, Persian writer
 Reza Rahadian Matulessy (born 1987), Indonesian actor
 Reza Sadeghi, Iranian pop singer 
 Reza Samani, Iranian musician
 Reza Shafiei Jam, Iranian actor
 Reza Shah-Kazemi, British author 
 Reza Vohdani, Iranian musician
 Reza Yazdani (singer)
 Rida Al Abdullah, Iraqi singer
 Raza Murad, Indian actor

Criminals
 Agha Muhammad Reza Baig - Iranian Shia Muslim who claimed to be the Mahdi and twelfth imam, engaged in battles against the East India Company and Kachari Kingdom.
 Redha al-Najar, Tunisian prisoner
 Reza Alinejad, Iranian juvenile offender
 Reza Khan, Afghan Islamist
 Reza Zarrab, Iranian businessman
 Riza Aziz, Malaysian film producer

Politics
 Abidur Reza Chowdhury (1872–1961), Bengali politician and educationist
 Reza Fallah (1909-1982), Iranian businessman and political advisor 
 Reza Ghotbi, Iranian politician 
 Reza Hosseini, Iranian humanitarian
 Reza Khelili Dylami, Swedish politician
 Redha Malek, Algerian Former Prime Minister
 Reza Moridi, Canadian politician
 Reza Ostadi, Iranian politician
 Reza Pahlavi, last crown prince of the former Imperial State of Iran 
 Reza Shah Pahlavi, Shah of Iran
 Reza Zanjani, Iranian politician
 Reza Zarei, Iranian military commander
 Rida al-Rikabi, Syrian politician
 Rıza Nur, Turkish politician
 Rıza Türmen (born 1941), Turkish judge and politician

Sports
 Reza Ahadi, Iranian footballer
 Reza Chahkhandagh, Iranian judoka
 Reza Enayati, Iranian footballer
 Reza Ghoochannejhad, Iranian-Dutch footballer 
 Reza Hassanzadeh (disambiguation), multiple Iranian footballers
 Reza Jabbari, Iranian footballer
 Reza Khaleghifar, Iranian footballer
 Reza Niknazar, Iranian footballer
 Reza Sahebi, Iranian footballer
 Reza Soukhteh Saraei, Iranian wrestler
 Reza Shahroudi, Iranian footballer
 Reza Talabeh, Iranian footballer
 Reza Torabian, Iranian footballer
 Reza Vatankhah, Iranian footballer
 Reza Yazdani, Iranian wrestler

Variants
 Roda Antar (born 1980), Lebanese footballer
 Rıza Çalımbay, Turkish footballer
 Rida Lah Douliazale, Moroccan footballer
 Rıza Kayaalp (born 1989), Turkish wrestler
 Rizah Mešković, Bosnian footballer
 Rıza Şen, Turkish footballer
 Redha Tukar, Saudi Arabian footballer
 Rıza Yıldırım (born 1987), Turkish wrestler

Derived names

Abdol Reza

 People with the theophoric given name.

Ali Reza

 People with the given name, after Ali Reza (765-818), Imam and eight descendant of the Islamic prophet Muhammad.

Gholam Reza

 People with the given name, meaning servant of the contented one

Mohammad Reza

 People with the given name, after Mohammad Reza (1919–1980), the last Shah of Iran.

Surname
 Afgansyah Reza (born 1989), Indonesian singer, songwriter, and actor
 Ahmed Rıza ((1858–1930), Ottoman Turkish politician
 Fahmi Reza, Malaysian political graphic designer, street artist and documentary film maker 
 Farhad Reza (born 1986), Bangladeshi cricketer
 Fazlollah Reza (1915–2019), Iranian academic
 Flo Rida, American singer and rapper
 Ghaleb Rida, Lebanese basketball player
 Hadem Rida, Palestinian politician
 Kévin Reza (born 1988), French professional road bicycle racer
 Liudvikas Rėza (1776–1840), Prussian-Lithuanian author a.k.a. Ludwig Rhesa
 Omer Riza, footballer
 Rashid Rida, Syrian scholar
 Syed Salim Raza, British Pakistani banker
 Yasmina Reza (born 1959), Iranian-French playwright

Spanish surname
 Itzel Reza, Mexican sprint canoer
 Lilia Merodio Reza (born 1978), Mexican politician

Fictional characters
 Reza, character in Gol & Gincu television series
 Reza Temiz, character in Dreamfall: The Longest Journey game
 Reza, a pyromancer in the mobile MOBA game Vainglory
 Reza Zaydan, a Moroccan general from HITMAN (2016)

References

External links
 Reza – Origin and Meaning of the name Reza at BabyNames.com

Arabic-language surnames
Arabic masculine given names
Iranian masculine given names
Pakistani masculine given names
Turkish-language surnames
Turkish masculine given names